Wood Station is an unincorporated community in Catoosa County, in the U.S. state of Georgia.

History
The community was named after Johnny Wood, proprietor of a local country store. Variant names are "Woods Station" and "Woodstation". A post office called Wood's Station was established in 1837, and remained in operation until 1907.

Education
Public education in Wood Station is administered by Catoosa County Public Schools. The district operates Woodstation Elementary School.

References

Unincorporated communities in Georgia (U.S. state)
Unincorporated communities in Catoosa County, Georgia